Charles Arthur (5 February 1808 – 29 July 1884) was an Australian cricketer, who played for Tasmania. Although he only represented the state in one match, he has the distinction of having participated in the first ever first-class cricket match in Australia. Arthur died on 29 July 1884, in Longford, Tasmania, at the age of 76.

References

External links

1808 births
1884 deaths
Australian cricketers
Tasmania cricketers
Cricketers from Plymouth, Devon
English emigrants to Australia